Stories of Johnny is the second studio album by the British singer/songwriter Marc Almond. It was released in September 1985 and reached number 22 on the UK Albums Chart. Stories of Johnny includes the singles "Stories of Johnny", "Love Letter" and "The House is Haunted".

Almond with his assembled band The Willing Sinners, made up of Annie Hogan, Billy McGee, Martin McCarrick, Richard Riley and Steven Humphreys, accompanied by studio musicians recorded the songs for album at Hartmann Digital Studios in Bavaria and Battery Studios, Power Plant Studios and Odyssey Studios in London. The artwork was designed by Huw Feather with photography by Andy Catlin.

Track listing

Personnel
 Marc Almond – vocals, all arrangements
 The Willing Sinners
 Annie Hogan – piano, vibes, synthesizer, marimba
 Martin McCarrick – cello, synthesizer
 Richard Riley – guitar
 Billy McGee – bass guitar
 Steven Humphreys – drums
with:
 Martin Ditcham – percussion
 Enrico Tomasso – trumpet, flugelhorn
 Julie Allis – harp
 Gini Ball – violin
 Jane West – backing vocals
 Audrey Riley – backing vocals
Technical
 Mike Hedges – Producer
 Tom Thiel – Engineering (Haartman)
 Stephen McLaughlin – Engineering (Battery)
 Ben Rogan – Engineering (Powerplant)
 Pete Brown – Engineering (Powerplant)
 Marc Frank – Engineering (Odyssey)
 Paul Batchelor – Engineering (Odyssey)
 Huw Feather – Design
 Andy Catlin – Photography

References

1985 albums
Marc Almond albums
Albums produced by Mike Hedges
Virgin Records albums